Sainte-Marie or Ste. Marie (French for Saint Mary) may refer to the several places:

In Metropolitan France

Sainte-Marie, Ardennes
Sainte-Marie, Cantal
Sainte-Marie, Doubs
Sainte-Marie, Gers
Sainte-Marie, Ille-et-Vilaine
Sainte-Marie, Hautes-Alpes
Sainte-Marie, Hautes-Pyrénées
Sainte-Marie, Nièvre
Sainte-Marie, Pyrénées-Orientales
Sainte-Marie-à-Py, Marne département 
Sainte-Marie-au-Bosc, Seine-Maritime département
Sainte-Marie-aux-Chênes, Moselle département 
Sainte-Marie-aux-Mines, Haut-Rhin département 
Sainte-Marie-Cappel, Nord département 
Sainte-Marie-d'Alloix, Isère département
Sainte-Marie-d'Alvey, Savoie département  
Sainte-Marie-de-Chignac, Dordogne département 
Sainte-Marie-de-Cuines, Savoie département 
Sainte-Marie-de-Gosse, Landes département 
Sainte-Marie-de-Ré, Charente-Maritime département 
Sainte-Marie-des-Champs, Seine-Maritime département 
Sainte-Marie-de-Vatimesnil, Eure département 
Sainte-Marie-de-Vaux, Haute-Vienne département 
Sainte-Marie-du-Bois, Manche
Sainte-Marie-du-Bois, Mayenne
Sainte-Marie-du-Lac-Nuisement, Marne département 
Sainte-Marie-du-Mont, Isère
Sainte-Marie-du-Mont, Manche 
Sainte-Marie-en-Chanois, Haute-Saône département
Sainte-Marie-en-Chaux, Haute-Saône département 
Sainte-Marie-Kerque, Pas-de-Calais département 
Sainte-Marie-la-Blanche, Côte-d'Or département 
Sainte-Marie-Lapanouze, Corrèze département
Sainte-Marie-la-Robert, Orne département 
Sainte-Marie-Laumont, Calvados département
Sainte-Marie-Outre-l'Eau, Calvados département 
Sainte-Marie-sur-Mer, a former commune of the Loire-Atlantique département
Sainte-Marie-sur-Ouche, Côte-d'Or département

In Canada
Sainte-Marie-de-Kent, New Brunswick
Sainte-Marie Parish, New Brunswick
Sainte-Marie among the Hurons, a 17th-century French Jesuit mission located near modern Midland, Ontario
Sainte-Marie, Quebec
Sainte-Marie-de-Blandford, Quebec
Sainte-Marie-Salomé, Quebec
Sainte-Marie (provincial electoral district), a former Quebec provincial electoral district
Sainte-Marie, Montreal, a neighbourhood and district of Montreal
Sainte-Marie–Saint-Jacques, a Quebec provincial electoral district including the neighbourhood of Sainte-Marie
Sainte-Marie Island (Richelieu River), an island of the Richelieu River in Carignan, Quebec
Sainte-Marie River (Anticosti Island), a tributary of the Gulf of St. Lawrence in L'Île-d'Anticosti, Quebec, Canada

In the United States
Sainte Marie among the Iroquois, a 17th-century French Jesuit mission located on Onondaga Lake, New York
Ste. Marie, Illinois, a village
Ste. Marie Church (Manchester, New Hampshire), a Roman Catholic church in Manchester, New Hampshire

Elsewhere
Sainte-Marie, Martinique, a town and commune
Île Sainte-Marie, a small island in the northeastern part of Madagascar
Sainte-Marie, Réunion

See also
Saint Marie (disambiguation)
Saint Mary (disambiguation)
Sault Ste. Marie, Michigan
Sault Ste. Marie, Ontario